{{DISPLAYTITLE:C22H25NO2}}
The molecular formula C22H25NO2 (molar mass: 335.44 g/mol) may refer to:

 JWH-250, or 1-pentyl-3-(2-methoxyphenylacetyl)indole
 JWH-302
 Lobelanine
 RTI-120

Molecular formulas